Clivina interstitialis is a species of ground beetle in the subfamily Scaritinae. It was described by W.Kolbe in 1883.

References

interstitialis
Beetles described in 1883